Nancy C. Kranich is an American librarian.  She served as president of the American Library Association from 2000-2001.  During her term as the American Library Association's president, she focused on libraries' role in building democracies.

Career 

Kranich worked at the New York University Libraries from  1978-2002. She held several positions including  associate dean, director of public services and director of administrative services

She is on the faculty of Rutgers University-New Brunswick where she teaches courses on Community Engagement; Information Policy; and Intellectual Freedom.

Kranich has been engaged in public policy work including health literacy;<ref>Kranich, Nancy. 2021. “Health Literacy in Diverse Communities: The Strength of Weak Ties—An Exploration between Academic Researchers and Public Libraries in Central New Jersey.” Library Trends 69 (4): 1–28.</ref> intellectual freedom;  the civic role of libraries with the  Kettering Foundation; and as Founder of the American Library Association Center for Civic Life.

Selected publications 
Kranich, Nancy C. (2021) "Democracy, Community, and Libraries" in  Mary Ann Davis Fournier and Sarah Ostman, eds Ask, Listen, Empower: Grounding Your Library Work in Community Engagement, pp. 1-15. Chicago: ALA editions.
Kranich, Nancy C., and Joneta Belfrage. Libraries & Democracy: The Cornerstones of Liberty. Chicago: American Library Association, 2001.  
Kranich, Nancy C. (2010) "Academic Libraries As Hubs For Deliberative Democracy," Journal of Public Deliberation'': Vol. 6 : Iss. 1, Article 4. Available at: http://www.publicdeliberation.net/jpd/vol6/iss1/art4

References

External links

 

Rutgers University faculty
American librarians
American women librarians
Living people
Year of birth missing (living people)
Presidents of the American Library Association
American women academics
21st-century American women